Kevin Kehily (born 1949) is an Irish former Gaelic footballer and coach. At club level he played with Newcestown, divisional side Carbery and at inter-county level with the Cork senior football team. He usually lined out as a defender.

Playing career

A member of the Newcestown club, Kehily won Southwest Schools' Shield and Divisional Juvenile Championship titles in his early playing days. He also lined out with Bandon and won Munster Colleges' titles as a dual player with Hamilton High School. Kehily's adult club career with Newcestown lasted over 20 years, during which time he won junior championship titles in both codes as well as an intermediate championship title as a footballer in 1971. He also earned inclusion on the Carbery divisional team and was part of their County Championship-winning teams in 1968 and 1971. Kehily first appeared on the inter-county scene as part of the Cork minor team that won the 1967 All-Ireland Minor Championship, before winning an All-Ireland Under-21 Championship title in 1970. By this stage Kehily had already began his 15-year association with the Cork senior football team. During that time he won three Munster Championship and two All-Stars, however, his university studies in London resulted in him missing Cork's defeat of Tyrone in the 1973 All-Ireland final. Kehily also won five Railway Cup medals with Munster.

Coaching career

Kehily's occupation as a physical education instructor resulted in him being appointed trainer of the Cork senior hurling team in 1975. Over the following three seasons Cork secured three successive All-Ireland Championship titles. Kehily also had a spell in charge of the Courcey Rovers club before returning as Cork senior hurling team trainer in 1993.

Honours

University College Dublin
Fitzgibbon Cup: 1969

Newcestown
Cork Intermediate Football Championship: 1971
Cork Junior Hurling Championship: 1972, 1980
Cork Junior Football Championship: 1967
South West Junior A Hurling Championship: 1967, 1969, 1972, 1979, 1980
South West Junior A Football Championship: 1967

Carbery
Cork Senior Football Championship: 1968, 1971

Cork
Munster Senior Football Championship: 1971, 1974, 1983
All-Ireland Under-21 Football Championship: 1970
Munster Under-21 Football Championship: 1969, 1970
All-Ireland Minor Football Championship: 1967
Munster Minor Football Championship: 1967

Munster
Railway Cup: 1976, 1977, 1978, 1981, 1982

References

1949 births
Living people
Bandon hurlers
Newcestown hurlers
Newcestown Gaelic footballers
Carbery Gaelic footballers
Carbery hurlers
Cork inter-county Gaelic footballers
Munster inter-provincial Gaelic footballers
Hurling managers